The 1990 Ontario general election  was held on September 6, 1990, to elect members of the 35th Legislative Assembly of the province of Ontario, Canada. The governing Ontario Liberal Party led by Premier David Peterson was unexpectedly defeated. Although the Peterson government, and Peterson himself, were very popular, he was accused of opportunism in calling an election just three years into his mandate. In a shocking upset, the New Democratic Party (NDP), led by Bob Rae, won a majority government. This marked the first time the NDP had won government east of Manitoba, and to date the only time the NDP formed the government in Ontario.

Not even the NDP expected to come close to winning power. Rae had already made plans to retire from politics after the election; however, the NDP managed to take many seats in the Greater Toronto Area (GTA) from the Liberals, and Rae himself represented York South, in Metro Toronto. They also did better than ever before, or in some cases since, in many other cities and rural areas. The NDP finished only five points ahead of the Liberals in the popular vote, but due to the nature of the first-past-the-post electoral system, which ignores the popular vote and awards power based on the number of ridings won, the NDP's gains in the GTA decimated the Liberal caucus. The Liberals lost 59 seats, the second-worst defeat for a governing party in Ontario. At the time, it was the Liberals' worst showing in an Ontario election. Peterson himself was heavily defeated in London Centre by NDP challenger Marion Boyd, losing by 8,200 votes, one of the few times a provincial premier has lost their own seat.

Although Mike Harris's Progressive Conservative Party was unable to overcome voter distrust of the federal Progressive Conservative government of Brian Mulroney, his party managed to make a net gain of four seats. Although Harris was from northern Ontario, the Tories were particularly weak in that region, placing fourth, behind the Liberals, NDP, and the right-wing Confederation of Regions Party (CoR) in six northern Ontario ridings (Algoma, Cochrane South, Nickel Belt, Sudbury, Sudbury East, and Sault Ste. Marie). The CoR also placed ahead of the Progressive Conservatives in the Renfrew North and Cornwall ridings in eastern Ontario. Although they received only 1.9% of the vote provincewide, they managed 7.8% in the 33 ridings in which they actually fielded a candidate.

The Green Party of Ontario placed third, ahead of the NDP, in Parry Sound riding, where former Liberal leadership candidate Richard Thomas was the party's candidate.

Results

Opinion Polls
On September 1, it was reported that an Angus Reid-Southam poll had put the NDP with 38% support, with the Liberals at 34% and the PCs at 24% and others at 4%, with 18% undecided and a margin of error of 3.3%. This was following an August 28 Star-CFTO poll 34% for the NDP, 40% for the Liberals, and 23% for the PCs with 3% undecided.

Constituency results

Ottawa-Carleton

|-
| style="background:whitesmoke;"|Carleton     
Total votes: 38,074
| 
|Sue LeBrun  10,143 (26.6%)
||
|Norm Sterling  17,860 (46.9%)
|
|Alex Munter  10,071 (26.5%)
|
|
||
|Norm Sterling
|-
| style="background:whitesmoke;"|Carleton East
Total votes: 35,376
||
|Gilles Morin  19,059 (53.9%)
|
|Judy Corbishley  5,117 (14.5%)
|
|Joan Gullen  9,976 (28.2%)
|
|W. André Lafrance  (FCP) 1,224 (3.5%)
||
|Gilles Morin
|-
| style="background:whitesmoke;"|Nepean
Total votes: 32,328
||
|Hans Daigeler  13,723 (42.5%)
|
|Doug Collins  9,870 (30.5%)
|
|John Raudoy  7,453 (23.1%)
|
|Dan Roy (G)933 (2.9%)  Dan Weiler (Lbt)349 (1.1%)
||
|Hans Daigeler
|-
| style="background:whitesmoke;"|Ottawa Centre 
Total votes: 30,446
|
|Richard Patten  11,656 (38.3%)
|
|Alex Burney  2,723 (8.9%)
||
|Evelyn Gigantes  14,522 (47.7%)
|
|John Gay (FCP)809 (2.7%) Bill Hipwell (G)576 (1.9%)John Turmel (Ind)160 (0.5%)
||
|Richard Patten
|-
| style="background:whitesmoke;"|
[[Ottawa—Vanier (provincial electoral district)|Ottawa East]] 
Total votes: 26,218
||
|Bernard Grandmaître  16,363 (62.4%)
|
|Diana Morin  2,203 (8.4%)
|
|Lori Lucier  6,103 (23.3%)
|
|Richard Hudon (FCP)826 (3.2%)  Frank de Jong (G)723 (2.7%)
||
|Bernard Grandmaître 
|-
| style="background:whitesmoke;"|Ottawa—Rideau 
Total votes: 29,695
||
|Yvonne O'Neill  13,454 (45.3%)
|
|Paul Beaudry  5,234 (17.6%)
|
|Larry Jones  8,845 (29.8%)
|
|Larry Denys (FCP)1,049 (3.5%)  Jim MacPhee (Ind)861 (2.9%)  Marc Schindler (Lbt)252 (0.8%)
||
|Yvonne O'Neill 
|-
| style="background:whitesmoke;"|Ottawa South
Total votes: 30,185
||
|Dalton McGuinty  13,845 (45.9%)
|
|Darrel Kent  7,399 (24.5%)
|
|Margaret Armstrong  7,826 (25.9%)
|
|Stephen Johns (G)612 (2.0%)  David Fitzpatrick (FCP)503 (1.7%)
||
|Dalton McGuinty, Sr.
|-
| style="background:whitesmoke;"|Ottawa West
Total votes: 33,422
||
|Bob Chiarelli  13,908 (41.6%)
|
|Brian Mackey  9,068 (27.1%)
|
|Allan Edwards  8,391 (25.1%)
|
|David Boyd (CoR)1,044 (3.1%)  Ian Whyte (G)  1,011 (3.0%)
||
|Bob Chiarelli
|}

Eastern Ontario

|-
| style="background:whitesmoke;"|Cornwall   
Total votes: 27 347
|| 
|John Cleary  12 725 (46.5%)
|
|Don Kannon  3169 (11.6%)
|
|Leo Courville  7044 (26.5%)
|
|Carol-Ann Ross (CoR) 4409 (16.1%)
||
|John Cleary
|- 
| style="background:whitesmoke;"|Frontenac—Addington
Total votes: 29,174
|
|Larry South  8,226 (28.2%)
|
|Jim Bennett  8,211 (28.1%)
||
|Fred Wilson   9,696 (33.2%)
|
|Gail Leonard  (FCP) 2,020 (6.9%)  Ross Baker  1,021 (3.5%)
||
|Larry South
|-
| style="background:whitesmoke;"|Hastings—Peterborough
Total votes: 28 282
|
|Mike Beeston  4285 (15.2%)
|
|Jim Pollock  10 387 (36.7%)
||
|Elmer Buchanan  11 283 (39.9%)
|
|Anthony Kuttschrutter  (FCP) 1199 (4.2%)  
Ronald Gerow  (CoR) 1128 (4.0%)
||
|Jim Pollock
|-
| style="background:whitesmoke;"|Kingston and the Islands
Total votes: 26 807
|
|Ken Keyes  8092 (30.2%)
|
|John Goodchild  7079 (26.4%)
||
|Gary Wilson  10184 (38.0%)
|
|Joan Jackson  (FCP) 1452 (5.4%)
||
|Ken Keyes
|-
| style="background:whitesmoke;"|Lanark-Renfrew  Total votes: 34 060
|
|Guin Persaud  9665 (28.4%)
||
|Leo Jordan  11 063 (32.5%)
|
|Harry Martin  8541 (25.1%)
|
|Murray Reid  (CoR) 2938 (8.6%)  Frank Foley  (FCP) 1853 (5.4%)
||
|Douglas Wiseman
|-
| style="background:whitesmoke;"|Leeds–Grenville
Total votes: 34 330
|
|Chris Puddicombe  9172 (26.7%)
||
|Bob Runciman  16 846 (49.1%)
|
|Art Lane  8312 (24.2%)
|
|
||
|Bob Runciman
|-
| style="background:whitesmoke;"|Prescott and Russell
Total votes: 39 833
||
|Jean Poirier  25 879 (65.0%)
|
|Keith Flavell  2848 (7.1%)
|
|Carole Roy  9369 (23.5%)
|
|Paul Lauzon  (FCP) 1119 (2.8%)  Jean-Serge Brisson  (Lbt) 618 (1.6%)
||
|Jean Poirier
|-
| style="background:whitesmoke;"|Prince Edward—Lennox
Total votes: 27 752
|
|Keith MacDonald  8188 (29.5%)
|
|Don Bonter  8299 (29.9%)
||
|Paul Johnson  9204 (33.2%)
|
|Kenn Hineman  (CoR) 2061 (7.4%)
||
|Keith MacDonald
|-
| style="background:whitesmoke;"|Quinte
Total votes: 29 691
||
|Hugh O'Neil  11 114 (37.4%)
|
|Doug Rollins  5825 (19.6%)
|
|Greg Meehan  7010 (23.6%)
|
|Stu Meeks  (CoR) 3411 (11.5%)  Dave Switzer  (FCP) 2331 (7.9%)
||
|Hugh O'Neil
|-
| style="background:whitesmoke;"|Renfrew North
Total votes: 30 198
||
|Sean Conway  13 082 (43.3%)
|
|Diane Yakabuski  4586 (15.2%)
|
|Ish Theilheimer  5916 (19.6%)
|
|Frank Adlam  (CoR) 5510 (18.2%)  Stephen Stanistreet  (FCP) 1104 (3.7%)
||
|Sean Conway
|-
| style="background:whitesmoke;"|Stormont—Dundas—Glengarry & East Grenville
Total votes: 29 082
|
|Denis Sabourin  8386 (28.8%)
||
|Noble Villeneuve  11 887 (40.9%)
|
|Helena McCuaig  5357 (18.4%)
|
|Bernie Lauzon  (CoR) 3452 (11.9%)
||
|Noble Villeneuve
|}

Central Ontario

|-
| style="background:whitesmoke;"|Bruce     
Total votes: 30,429
|| 
|Murray Elston  11,476 (37.7%)
|
|Terry Halpin  7,349 (24.2%)
|
|Len Hope  7,954 (26.2%)
|
|Linda Freiburger  (FCP) 3,639 (12.0%)
||
|Murray Elston
|-
| style="background:whitesmoke;"|Dufferin—Peel     
Total votes: 31,447
| 
|Mavis Wilson  10 327 (32.8%)
||
|David Tilson  10,899 (34.7%)
|
|Sandra Crane  8,627 (27.4%)
|
|Bob Shapton  (Lbt) 1,594 (5.1%)
||
|Mavis Wilson
|-
| style="background:whitesmoke;"|Bruce-Grey—Owen Sound     
Total votes: 38,056
| 
|Ron Lipsett  10,257 (27.0%)
||
|Bill Murdoch  13,742 (36.1%)
|
|Peggy Hutchinson  11,280 (29.6%)
|
|John Ross  (FCP) 2,157 (5.7%)  Don Cianci  (G) 476 (1.3%)  Oleh Stebelsky  (Lbt) 144 (0.4%)
||
|Ron Lipsett
|-
| style="background:whitesmoke;"|Muskoka-Georgian Bay     
Total votes: 33 031
| 
|Ken Black  9105 (27.6%)
|
|Marilyn Rowe  10 504 (31.8%)
||
|Dan Waters  13 422 (40.6%)
|
|
||
|Ken Black
|-
| style="background:whitesmoke;"|Northumberland     
Total votes: 35 740
|| 
|Joan Fawcett  11 984 (33.5%)
|
|Angus Read  10 890 (30.5%)
|
|Judi Armstrong  9581 (26.8%)
|
|Doug Young  (CoR) 1677 (4.7%)  Steve Prust  (FCP) 1213 (3.4%)  John Meiboom  (Lbt) 395 (1.1%)
||
|Joan Fawcett
|-
| style="background:whitesmoke;"|Peterborough     
Total votes: 41,888
| 
|Peter Adams  13,628 (32.5%)
|
|Doris Brick  8,884 (21.2%)
||
|Jenny Carter  13,813 (33.0%)
|
|John Harrington  (FCP) 3,652 (8.7%)  Dean Wasson  (CoR) 1,586 (3.8%)  Paul Cleveland  (G) 325 (0.8%)
||
|Peter Adams
|-
| style="background:whitesmoke;"|Simcoe Centre     
Total votes: 41 572
| 
|Bruce Owen  12 869 (31.0%)
|
|Ben Andrews  10 013 (24.1%)
||
|Paul Wessenger  15 711(37.8%)
|
|Bonnie Ainsworth  (CoR) 2979 (7.2%)
||
|Bruce Owen
|-
| style="background:whitesmoke;"|Simcoe East     
Total votes: 37 398
| 
|Jim Files  7219 (19.3%)
||
|Al McLean  14 828 (39.6%)
|
|Dennis Bailey  14 088 (37.7%)
|
|John McLean  (Lbt) 1263 (3.4%)
||
|Al McLean
|-
| style="background:whitesmoke;"|Simcoe West     
Total votes: 32 089
| 
|Gary Johnson  7765 (24.2%)
||
|Jim Wilson  11 710 (36.5%)
|
|Leo Loserit  9870 (30.8%)
|
|James McGillivray  (FCP) 2744 (8.6%)
||
|George McCague
|-
| style="background:whitesmoke;"|Victoria—Haliburton     
Total votes: 34 889
| 
|Patrick O'Reilly  7668 (22.0%)
|
|Ron Jenkins  8947 (25.6%)
||
|Dennis Drainville  15 467 (44.3%)
|
|Brad Medd  (FCP) 1419 (4.1%)  Hugh Boyd  971 (2.8%)  Ron Hawkrigg (Lbt) 417 (1.2%)
||
|John Eakins
|}

Durham & York Region

|-
| style="background:whitesmoke;"|Durham Centre     
Total votes: 35,096
|
|Allan Furlong  10,246 (29.2%)
|
|Jim Flaherty  9,126 (26.0%)
|| 
|Drummond White  12,594 (35.9%)
|
|Nino Maltese  (FCP) 1,186 (3.4%)  Phil Wyatt  (CoR) 1,087 (3.1%)  David Hubbell  (G) 857 (2.4%)
||
|Allan Furlong
|-
| style="background:whitesmoke;"|Durham East     
Total votes: 33 476
|
|Marilyn Pearce  7836 (23.4%)
|
|Kirk Kemp  10 907 (32.6%)
|| 
|Gord Mills  10 960 (32.7%)
|
|Tim Crookall  (FCP) 2487 (7.4%)  Harry Turnbridge  (CoR) 1286 (3.8%)
||
|Sam Cureatz
|-
| style="background:whitesmoke;"|Durham West     
Total votes: 43,678
|
|Norah Stoner  14,384 (32.9%)
|
|Rick Johnson  11,167 (25.6%)
|| 
|Jim Wiseman  16,366 (37.5%)
|
|Bert Vermeer  (FCP) 1,761 (4.0%)
||
|Norah Stoner
|-
| style="background:whitesmoke;"|Durham—York     
Total votes: 36 284
|
|Bill Ballinger  11 067 (30.5%)
|
|Jack Hauseman  10 904 (30.5%)
|| 
|Larry O'Connor  12 297 (33.9%)
|
|Jerry Young  (FCP) 2016 (5.6%)
||
|Bill Ballinger
|-
| style="background:whitesmoke;"|Markham     
Total votes: 51 221
|
|Frank Scarpitti  15 128 (29.5%)
||
|Don Cousens  25 595 (50.0%)
| 
|Rob Saunders  8459 (16.5%)
|
|Eric Skura  (FCP) 1086 (2.1%)  Ian Hutchison  (Lbt) 642 (1.3%)  Gary Walsh  311 (0.6%)
||
|Don Cousens
|-
| style="background:whitesmoke;"|Oshawa     
Total votes: 27 173 
|
|Jim Carlyle  5116 (18.8%)
|
|Cliff Fillmore  3871 (14.2%)
||
|Allan Pilkey  16 601 (61.1%)
|
|Gary Jones  (CoR) 1585 (5.8%)
||
|Michael Breaugh
|-
| style="background:whitesmoke;"|York Centre     
Total votes: 61 562
||
|Greg Sorbara  28 056 (45.6%)
|
|Dion McGuire  14 656 (23.8%)
| 
|Laurie Orrett  18 850 (30.6%)
|
|
||
|Greg Sorbara
|-
| style="background:whitesmoke;"|York—Mackenzie     
Total votes: 33,437
||
|Charles Beer  11,452 (34.3%)
|
|George Timpson  11,304 (33.8%)
| 
|Keith Munro  10,681 (31.9%)
|
|
||
|Charles Beer
|}

Scarborough

|-
| style="background:whitesmoke;"|Scarborough—Agincourt     
Total votes: 30 118
||
|Gerry Phillips  13 347 (44.3%)
|
|Keith MacNab  8640 (28.7%)
| 
|Ayoub Ali  6763 (22.5%)
|
|Bill Galster  (Lbt) 1368 (4.5%)
||
|Gerry Phillips
|-
| style="background:whitesmoke;"|Scarborough Centre     
Total votes: 27,262
|
|Cindy Nicholas  9,256 (34.0%)
|
|Joe Trentadue  5,682 (20.8%)
||
|Steve Owens  12,324 (45.2%)
|
|
||
|Cindy Nicholas
|-
| style="background:whitesmoke;"|Scarborough East     
Total votes: 32 915
|
|Ed Fulton  9926 (30.2%)
|
|Steve Gilchrist  9890 (30.0%)
||
|Bob Frankford  11 700 (35.5%)
|
|Jim McIntosh  (Lbt) 577 (1.8%)  Cara Mumford  (G) 454 (1.4%)  Darryl McDowell  368 (1.1%)
||
|Ed Fulton
|-
| style="background:whitesmoke;"|Scarborough—Ellesmere     
Total votes: 29 119
|
|Frank Faubert  9417 (32.3%)
|
|Greg Vezina  4855 (16.7%)
||
|David Warner  14 036 (48.2%)
|
|Kelvin Smith  (Lbt) 811 (2.8%)
||
|Frank Faubert
|-
| style="background:whitesmoke;"|Scarborough North     
Total votes: 30 056
||
|Alvin Curling  13 393 (44.6%)
|
|Harold Adams  5367 (17.9%)
|
|Victor Deane  9477 (31.5%)
|
|Louis Di Rocco  (FCP) 1199 (4.0%)  James Greig  (G) 620 (2.1%)
||
|Alvin Curling
|-
| style="background:whitesmoke;"|Scarborough West     
Total votes: 28 027
|
|Joe Pacione  6521 (23.3%)
|
|Jim Brown  5769 (20.6%)
||
|Anne Swarbrick  14 340 (51.2%)
|
|Stefan Slovak  (FCP) 996 (3.6%)  George Dance  (Lbt) 401 (1.4%)
||
|Richard Johnston
|}

North York & East York

|-
| style="background:whitesmoke;"|Don Mills     
Total votes: 28,483
|
|Murad Velshi  8,786 (30.8%)
|
|Nola Crewe  7,631 (26.8%)
||
|Margery Ward  9,740 (34.2%)
|
|David Miller  (Lbt) 742 (2.6%)  Katherine Mathewson  (G) 608 (2.1%)  Colin McKay  562 (2.0%)  David Pengelly  (F) 414 (1.5%)
||
|Murad Velshi
|-
| style="background:whitesmoke;"|Downsview     
Total votes: 23 755
|
|Laureano Leone  8219 (34.6%)
|
|Chris Smith  1477 (6.2%)
||
|Anthony Perruzza  13 440 (56.6%)
|
|David Kenny  (Lbt) 619 (2.6%)
||
|Laureano Leone
|-
| style="background:whitesmoke;"|Lawrence     
Total votes: 26 364
||
|Joseph Cordiano  11 786 (44.7%)
|
|Henry Gallay  3557 (13.5%)
|
|Shalom Schachter  10 179 (38.6%)
|
|Sandor Hegedus  (Lbt) 431 (1.6%)  Paul Rombough  (G) 411 (1.6%)
||
|Joseph Cordiano
|-
| style="background:whitesmoke;"|Oriole     
Total votes: 25 454
||
|Elinor Caplan  10 655 (41.9%)
|
|Sam Billich  5435 (21.4%)
|
|Lennox Farrell  8441 (33.2%)
|
|Roland Brown  (Lbt) 578 (2.3%)  Greg Knittl  (G) 345 (1.4%)
||
|Elinor Caplan
|-
| style="background:whitesmoke;"|Willowdale     
Total votes: 33,947
|
|Gino Matrundola  11,123 (32.7%)
||
|Charles Harnick  11,957 (35.2%)
|
|Batya Hebdon  9,125 (26.9%)
|
|Mark Vosylius  (FCP) 1,074 (3.2%)  Earl Epstein  (Lbt) 688 (2.0%)
||
|Gino Matrundola
|-
| style="background:whitesmoke;"|Wilson Heights     
Total votes: 27,725
||
|Monte Kwinter  12,272 (44.3%)
|
|Steven Kerzner  4,913 (17.7%)
|
|John Fagan  9,618 (34.7%)
|
|Vanessa Schoor  (G) 608 (2.2%)  Roman Vrba  (Lbt) 314 (1.1%)
||
|Monte Kwinter
|-
| style="background:whitesmoke;"|York East    
Total votes: 29 848
|
|Christine Hart  9900 (33.2%)
|
|George Bryson  8021 (26.9%)
||
|Gary Malkowski  10 689 (35.8%)
|
|Jim Copeland  380 (1.3%)  Bedora Bojman  (G) 364 (1.2%)  John Matthew  (Lbt) 303 (1.0%)  Chris Frazer  (Comm) 191 (0.6%)
||
|Christine Hart
|-
| style="background:whitesmoke;"|York Mills    
Total votes: 29 207
|
|Brad Nixon  10 390 (35.6%)
||
|David Turnbull   13 037 (44.6%)
|
|Marcia McVea  4830 (16.5%)
|
|Janet Creery  (G) 577 (2.0%)  Mary-Anne Sillimaa  (Lbt) 373 (1.3%)
||
|Brad Nixon
|-
| style="background:whitesmoke;"|Yorkview    
Total votes: 20 059
|
|Claudio Polsinelli  8326 (41.5%)
|
|Pedro Cordoba   1254 (6.3%)
||
|Giorgio Mammoliti  9945 (49.6%)
|
|Roma Kelembet  (Lbt) 303 (1.5%)  Lucylle Boikoff  231 (1.2%)
||
|Claudio Polsinelli
|}

Toronto

|-
| style="background:whitesmoke;"|Beaches—Woodbine     
Total votes: 24 645
|
|Beryl Potter  6329 (25.7%)
|
|Kevin Forest  3535 (14.3%)
||
|Frances Lankin  14 381 (58.4%)
|
|Sam Vitulli  400 (1.6%)
||
|Marion Bryden
|-
| style="background:whitesmoke;"|Dovercourt     
Total votes: 19 548
|
|Tony Lupusella  6615 (33.8%)
|
|Allan Brown  1239 (6.3%)
||
|Tony Silipo  10 604 (54.2%)
|
|Norman Allen  (G) 577 (3.0%)  Fred Lambert  (Lbt) 513 (2.6%)
||
|Tony Lupusella
|-
| style="background:whitesmoke;"|Eglinton     
Total votes: 33 451
||
|Dianne Poole  12 032 (36.0%)
|
|Anne Vanstone  11 859 (35.5%)
|
|Jay Waterman  7772 (23.2%)
|
|Dan King  (G) 1340 (4.0%)  Scott Bell  (Lbt) 448 (1.3%)
||
|Dianne Poole
|-
| style="background:whitesmoke;"|Fort York     
Total votes: 23 806
|
|Bob Wong  9656 (40.6%)
|
|John Pepall  2258 (9.5%)
||
|Rosario Marchese  11 023 (46.3%)
|
|Paul Barker  (Lbt) 539 (2.3%)  Ronald Rodgers  330 (1.4%)
||
|Bob Wong
|-
| style="background:whitesmoke;"|High Park—Swansea     
Total votes: 25 337
|
|David Fleet  8159 (32.2%)
|
|Yuri Pokaliwsky  4674 (18.4%)
||
|Elaine Ziemba  11 432 (45.1%)
|
|Colum Tingle  (FCP) 409 (1.6%)  Bill Senay  (G) 332 (1.3%)  Michael Beech  (Lbt) 331 (1.3%)
||
|David Fleet
|-
| style="background:whitesmoke;"|Parkdale     
Total votes: 17 417
||
|Tony Ruprecht  8080 (46.4%)
|
|John Swettenham  941 (5.4%)
|
||Sheena Weir  7557 (43.4%)
|
|Robert Hunter  (G) 325 (1.9%)  James McCulloch  (Lbt) 241 (1.4%)  Debra Stone   167 (1.0%)  Joe Young  (Ind [Communist League]) 106 (0.6%)
||
|Tony Ruprecht
|-
| style="background:whitesmoke;"|Riverdale     
Total votes: 22 729
|
|Pat Marquis  5572 (24.5%)
|
|John Ruffolo  1578 (6.9%)
||
|Marilyn Churley  14 086 (62.0%)
|
|Leanne Haze  (G) 811 (3.6%)  Daniel Hunt  (Lbt) 682 (3.0%)
||
|David Reville
|-
| style="background:whitesmoke;"|St. Andrew—St. Patrick     
Total votes: 29 956
|
|Ron Kanter  8938 (29.8%)
|
|Nancy Jackman  9241 (30.8%)
||
|Zanana Akande  10 321 (34.5%)
|
|Jim Harris  (G) 1112 (3.7%)  Douglas Quinn  (Lbt) 344 (1.1%)
||
|Ron Kanter
|-
| style="background:whitesmoke;"|St. George—St. David     
Total votes: 29 706
||
|Ian Scott  10 718 (36.1%)
|
|Keith Norton  6955 (23.4%)
|
|Carolann Wright  10 646 (35.8%)
|
|Ken Campbell  (FCP) 932 (3.1%)  Beverly Antrobus  (Lbt) 455 (1.5%)
||
|Ian Scott
|}

Etobicoke & York

|-
| style="background:whitesmoke;"|Etobicoke—Humber     
Total votes: 35 178
||
|Jim Henderson  13 582 (38.6%)
|
|Aileen Anderson  9289 (26.4%)
|
|Russ Springate  10 049 (28.6%)
|
|Tonny Dodds  (FCP) 1292 (3.7%)  David Moore  (G) 586 (1.7%)  Alan D'Orsay  (Lbt) 380 (1.1%)
||
|Jim Henderson
|-
| style="background:whitesmoke;"|Etobicoke—Lakeshore     
Total votes: 31 660
|
|Sam Shephard  7006 (22.1%)
|
|Jeff Knoll  4854 (15.3%)
||
|Ruth Grier  18 118 (57.2%)
|
|Trish O'Connor  (FCP) 1053 (3.3%)  Phaedra Livingstone  (G) 629 (2.0%)
||
|Ruth Grier
|-
| style="background:whitesmoke;"|Etobicoke—Rexdale     
Total votes: 26 270
|
|Aurelio Acquaviva  4585 (17.5%)
|
|David Foster  3243 (12.3%)
||
|Ed Philip  17 620 (67.0%)
|
|David Burman  (G) 822 (3.1%)
||
|Ed Philip
|-
| style="background:whitesmoke;"|Etobicoke West     
Total votes: 33 810
|
|Linda LeBourdais  10 082 (29.8%)
||
|Chris Stockwell  13 713 (40.6%)
|
|Judy Jones  7992 (23.6%)
|
|Kevin McGourty  (FCP) 1045 (3.1%)  Geoffrey Lepper  (G) 354 (1.0%)  Janice Hazlett  (Lbt) 320 (1.0%)  Martin Fraser  304 (0.9%)
||
|Linda LeBourdais
|-
| style="background:whitesmoke;"|Oakwood     
Total votes: 21 384
|
|Chaviva Hošek  8143 (38.1%)
|
|Claudio Lewis  1671 (7.8%)
||
|Tony Rizzo  10 423 (48.7%)
|
|Steven Peck  (G) 595 (2.8%)  John Primerano  (Lbt) 355 (1.7%)  Elizabeth Rowley  (Comm) 197 (0.9%)
||
|Chaviva Hošek
|-
| style="background:whitesmoke;"|York South     
Total votes: 24 949
|
|Ozzie Grant  4534 (18.2%)
|
|Andrew Feldstein  2561 (10.3%)
||
|Bob Rae  16 642 (66.7%)
|
|Alex MacDonald  (Lbt) 759 (3.0%)  Phil Sarazen  (G) 453 (1.8%)
||
|Bob Rae
|}

Brampton, Mississauga & Halton

|-
| style="background:whitesmoke;"|Brampton North     
Total votes: 33,462
||
|Carman McClelland  11,686 (34.9%)
|
|Gary Heighington  7,619 (22.8%)
|
|John Devries  11,588 (34.6%)
|
|Margaret Lloyd  (FCP) 1,466 (4.4%)  Lewis Jackson  (Lbt) 669 (2.0%)  Martha MacDonald 434 (1.3%)
||
|Carman McClelland
|-
| style="background:whitesmoke;"|Brampton South     
Total votes: 39 985
||
|Bob Callahan  12 918 (32.3%)
|
|Maggie McCallion  11 395 (28.5%)
|
|John Scheer  12 494 (31.2%)
|
|Ron Nonato  (FCP) 2511 (6.3%)  Jim Bridgewood  (Comm) 667 (1.7%)
||
|Bob Callahan
|-
| style="background:whitesmoke;"|Burlington South     
Total votes: 32 520
|
|Marv Townsend  5544 (17.0%)
||
|Cam Jackson  17 084 (52.5%)
|
|Bob Wood  8185 (25.2%)
|
|Don Pennell  (FCP) 1707 (5.2%)
||
|Cam Jackson
|-
| style="background:whitesmoke;"|Halton Centre     
Total votes: 38 523
||
|Barbara Sullivan  13 494 (35.0%)
|
|Bob Taylor  12 279 (31.9%)
|
|Richard Banigan  10 163 (26.4%)
|
|James Bruce  (FCP) 1232 (3.2%)  Bill Frampton  (FP) 731 (1.9%)  Jim Stock  (Lbt) 624 (1.6%)
||
|Barbara Sullivan
|-
| style="background:whitesmoke;"|Halton North     
Total votes: 27,503
|
|Walt Elliot  7,962 (29.0%)
|
|Dave Whiting  7,499 (27.3%)
||
|Noel Duignan  8,510 (30.9%)
|
|Giuseppe Gori  (FCP) 2,489 (9.1%)  Patricia Kammerer  (G) 582  (2.1%) John Shadbolt  (Lbt) 461 (1.7%)
||
|Walt Elliot
|-
| style="background:whitesmoke;"|Mississauga East     
Total votes: 31 684
||
|John Sola  12 448 (39.3%)
|
|Brad Butt  8285 (26.1%)
|
|Mike Crone  9177 (29.0%)
|
|Peter Sesek  1363 (4.3%)  Chris Balabanian  (F) 411 (1.3%)
||
|John Sola
|-
| style="background:whitesmoke;"|Mississauga North     
Total votes: 33 442
||
|Steve Offer  12 658 (37.9%)
|
|John Snobelen  7990 (23.9%)
|
|John Foster  11 216 (33.5%)
|
|Ken Moores  (G) 946 (2.8%)  Howard Baker  632 (1.9%)
||
|Steve Offer
|-
| style="background:whitesmoke;"|Mississauga South     
Total votes: 32 652
|
|Donna Scott  6624 (20.3%)
||
|Margaret Marland  17 126 (52.5%)
|
|Sue Craig  7579 (23.2%)
|
|Scott McWhinnie  (G) 1323 (4.1%)
||
|Margaret Marland
|-
| style="background:whitesmoke;"|Mississauga West     
Total votes: 47 584
||
|Steve Mahoney  20 038 (42.1%)
|
|Judi Bachman  11 945 (25.1%)
|
|Tom Malone  13 938 (29.3%)
|
|Emanuel Batler  (Lbt) 892 (1.9%)  Dian Achiceko  771 (1.6%)
||
|Steve Mahoney
|-
| style="background:whitesmoke;"|Oakville South     
Total votes: 31,304
|
|Doug Carrothers  10,841 (34.6%)
||
|Gary Carr  10,949 (35.0%)
|
|Danny Dunleavy  6,423 (20.5%)
|
|Terry Hansford  (CoR) 1,057 (3.4%)  Josef Petriska  (G) 1,038 (3.3%)  Adriana Bassi  (FCP) 996 (3.2%)
||
|Doug Carrothers
|}

Hamilton-Wentworth & Niagara

|-
| style="background:whitesmoke;"|Hamilton Centre     
Total votes: 25 358
|
|Lily Oddie Munro  7814 (30.8%)
|
|Graham Snelgrove  2116 (8.3%)
||
|David Christopherson  14 029 (55.3%)
|
|Brent Monkley  (G) 605 (2.4%)  Julien Frost  (Lbt) 429 (1.7%)  Jewell Wolgram (FCP) 365 (1.4%)
||
|Lily Oddie Munro
|-
| style="background:whitesmoke;"|Hamilton East     
Total votes: 28 336
|
|Craig Dowhaniuk  5525 (19.5%)
|
|Rom Tomblin  1676 (5.9%)
||
|Robert W. Mackenzie  20 289 (71.6%)
|
|Emidio Corvaro  (FCP) 846 (3.0%)
||
|Robert W. Mackenzie
|-
| style="background:whitesmoke;"|Hamilton Mountain     
Total votes: 37 629
|
|Al Bailey  7432 (19.8%)
|
|Grant Darby  7709 (20.5%)
||
|Brian Charlton  22 488 (59.8%)
|
|
||
|Brian Charlton
|-
| style="background:whitesmoke;"|Hamilton West     
Total votes: 32 777
|
|Helen Wilson  7236 (22.1%)
|
|David Cairnie  4361 (13.3%)
||
|Richard Allen  18 550 (56.6%)
|
|Lynne Scime  (FCP) 2324 (7.1%)  Hans Wienhold  (CoR) 306 (0.9%)
||
|Richard Allen
|-
| style="background:whitesmoke;"|Lincoln     
Total votes: 34,141
|
|Harry Pelissero  11,055 (32.4%)
|
|Carol Walker  9,407 (27.6%)
||
|Ron Hansen  12,117 (35.5%)
|
|Doug Bougher  (CoR) 1,562 (4.6%)
||
|Harry Pelissero
|-
| style="background:whitesmoke;"|Niagara Falls     
Total votes: 29 939
|
|Wayne Campbell  7979 (26.7%)
|
|Norm Puttick  3896 (13.0%)
||
|Margaret Harrington  13 884 (46.4%)
|
|Ted Wiwchar  (CoR) 3141 (10.5%)  Art Klassen  (FCP) 674 (2.3%)  Donald MacDonald-Ross  (G) 365 (1.2%)
||
|Vince Kerrio
|-
| style="background:whitesmoke;"|Niagara South     
Total votes: 23 972
|
|John Lopinski  7232 (30.2%)
|
|Doug Martin  4032 (16.8%)
||
|Shirley Coppen  11 161 (46.6%)
|
|Glen Hutton  (CoR) 1547 (6.5%)
||
|Ray Haggerty
|-
| style="background:whitesmoke;"|St. Catharines     
Total votes: 29 835
||
|Jim Bradley  11 565 (38.8%)
|
|Bruce Timms  3926 (13.2%)
|
|Dave Kappele  10 629 (35.6%)
|
|Eva Longhurst  (CoR) 2384 (8.0%)  Bert Pynenburg  (FCP) 1331 (4.5%)
||
|Jim Bradley
|-
| style="background:whitesmoke;"|St. Catharines—Brock     
Total votes: 27,478
|
|Mike Dietsch  8,379 (30.5%)
|
|Bob Welch  6,969 (25.4%)
||
|Christel Haeck  9,538 (34.7%)
|
|Rodney Book  (CoR) 1,449 (5.3%)  Ed Klassen  (FCP) 873 (3.2%)  Conrad Gibbons  (Lbt) 270 (1.0%)
||
|Mike Dietsch
|-
| style="background:whitesmoke;"|Welland—Thorold     
Total votes: 32 202
|
|Gord McMillan  7557 (23.5%)
|
|Cam Wilson  2893 (9.0%)
||
|Peter Kormos  20488 (63.6%)
|
|John Sabados  (CoR) 878 (2.7%)  Barry Fitzgerald  (F) 386 (1.2%)
||
|Peter Kormos
|-
| style="background:whitesmoke;"|Wentworth East     
Total votes: 34 111
|
|Shirley Collins  12 077 (35.4%)
|
|Doug Conley  5609 (16.4%)
||
|Mark Morrow  15 224 (44.6%)
|
|Victor Kammerer  (G) 668 (2.0%)  Albert Papazian  273 (0.8%)  Anne Stasiuk  260 (0.8%)
||
|Shirley Collins
|-
| style="background:whitesmoke;"|Wentworth North     
Total votes: 33 692
|
|Chris Ward  11 384 (33.9%)
|
|Don Matthews  8740 (25.9%)
||
|Don Abel  11 472 (34.0%)
|
|Rien Vanden Enden  (FCP) 1236 (3.7%)  Eileen Butson  (CoR) 860 (2.6%)
||
|Chris Ward
|}

Midwestern Ontario

|-
| style="background:whitesmoke;"|Brantford     
Total votes: 36 474
|
|Dave Neumann  13 644 (37.4%)
|
|Dan Di Sabatino  3087 (8.5%)
||
|Brad Ward  17 736 (48.6%)
|
|Peter Quail  (FCP) 1413 (3.9%)  William Darfler  (G) 436 (1.2%)  Helmut Kurmis  (Lbt) 158 (0.4%)
||
|Dave Neumann
|-
| style="background:whitesmoke;"|Brant—Haldimand     
Total votes: 28 785
||
|Robert Nixon  10 751 (37.3%)
|
|Brett Kelly  6228 (21.6%)
|
|Chris Stanek  9282 (32.2%)
|
|Steve Elgersma  (FCP) 1520 (5.3%)  Jamie Legacey  (G) 1004 (3.5%)
||
|Robert Nixon
|-
| style="background:whitesmoke;"|Cambridge     
Total votes: 36 176
|
|John Bell  7557 (20.9%)
|
|Carl DeFaria  4449 (12.3%)
||
|Mike Farnan  21 806 (60.3%)
|
|Anneliese Steden  (FCP) 2364 (6.5%)
||
|Mike Farnan
|-
| style="background:whitesmoke;"|Guelph     
Total votes: 39 701
|
|Rick Ferraro  11 944 (30.1%)
|
|Linda Lennon  10 184 (25.7%)
||
|Derek Fletcher  15 051 (37.9%)
|
|John Gots  (FCP) 1602 (4.0%)  Bill Hulet  (G) 920 (2.3%)
||
|Rick Ferraro
|-
| style="background:whitesmoke;"|Huron     
Total votes: 29 070
|
|Jim Fitzgerald  6653 (22.9%)
|
|Ken Campbell  9066 (31.2%)
||
|Paul Klopp  10 020 (34.5%)
|
|Tom Clark  (FCP) 2931 (10.1%)  Allan Dettweiler  (Lbt) 400 (1.4%)
||
|Jack Riddell
|-
| style="background:whitesmoke;"|Kitchener     
Total votes: 33 640
|
|David Cooke  9731 (28.9%)
|
|Ian Matthew  6157 (18.3%)
||
|Will Ferguson  15 750 (46.8%)
|
|John Meenan  (FCP) 2002 (6.0%)
||
|David Cooke
|-
| style="background:whitesmoke;"|Kitchener—Wilmot     
Total votes: 36 537
|
|Carl Zehr  10 869 (29.7%)
|
|Lance Bryant  7342 (20.1%)
||
|Mike Cooper   16 056 (43.9%)
|
|Thomas Borys  (FCP) 2270 (6.2%)
||
|John Sweeney 
|-
| style="background:whitesmoke;"|Norfolk     
Total votes: 36 195
|
|Gord Miller  10 971 (30.3%)
|
|Clarence Abbott  10 374 (28.7%)
||
|Norm Jamison   14 850 (41.0%)
|
|
||
|Gord Miller
|-
| style="background:whitesmoke;"|Oxford     
Total votes: 36 504
|
|Charlie Tatham  9802 (26.9%)
|
|Jim Wilkins  9860 (27.0%)
||
|Kimble Sutherland  12 684 (34.7%)
|
|John Joosse  (FCP) 3182 (8.7%)  Kaye Sargent  (Lbt) 635 (1.7%)  Joe Byway  (F) 341 (0.9%)
||
|Charlie Tatham
|-
| style="background:whitesmoke;"|Perth     
Total votes: 31 802
|
|Gerry Teahen  8721 (27.4%)
|
|Ron Christie  8600 (27.0%)
||
|Karen Haslam  11 712 (36.8%)
|
|Gordon Maloney (FCP) 2769 (8.7%)
||
|Hugh Edighoffer
|-
| style="background:whitesmoke;"|Waterloo North     
Total votes: 38 883
|
|Andrew Telegdi  9441 (24.3%)
||
|Elizabeth Witmer  14 552 (37.4%)
|
|Hugh Miller  11 298 (29.1%)
|
|Ted Kryn  (FCP) 2946 (7.6%)  Rita Huschka-Sprague  (Lbt) 646 (1.7%)
||
|Herb Epp
|-
| style="background:whitesmoke;"|Wellington     
Total votes: 30 646
|
|John Green  7668 (25.0%)
||
|Ted Arnott  12 141 (39.6%)
|
|Dale Hamilton  10 837 (35.4%)
|
|
||
|Jack Johnson
|}

Southwestern Ontario

|-
| style="background:whitesmoke;"|Chatham—Kent   
Total votes: 31,138
| 
|Maurice Bossy  9,963 (32.0%)
|
|Charlie Tomecek   5,619 (18.0%)
||
|Randy Hope  13,930 (44.7%)
|
|Marcy Edwards  (FCP) 1,626 (5.2%)
||
|Maurice Bossy
|- 
| style="background:whitesmoke;"|Elgin   
Total votes: 34 047
| 
|Marietta Roberts  9723 (28.6%)
|
|Jim Williams  9031 (26.5%)
||
|Peter North  14 189 (41.7%)
|
|Ray Monteith  (F) 1104 (3.2%)
||
|Marietta Roberts
|- 
| style="background:whitesmoke;"|Essex-Kent   
Total votes: 30 116
| 
|Jim McGuigan  9968 (33.1%)
|
|Claire Atkinson  2739 (9.1%)
||
|Pat Hayes  15 858 (52.7%)
|
|Tim McGuire  (FCP) 1551 (5.2%)
||
|Jim McGuigan
|- 
| style="background:whitesmoke;"|Essex South   
Total votes: 29 358
|| 
|Remo Mancini  10 575 (36.0%)
|
|Joan Flood  6335 (21.6%)
|
|Donna Tremblay  10 363 (35.3%)
|
|Steve Posthumus  (FCP) 2085 (7.1%)
||
|Remo Mancini
|- 
| style="background:whitesmoke;"|Lambton   
Total votes: 27,675
| 
|David William Smith  7,291 (26.3%)
|
|Bob Langstaff  7,665 (27.7%)
||
|Ellen MacKinnon  8,691 (31.4%)
|
|Jim Hopper  (FCP) 3,557 (12.9%)  Kim Beatson  (CoR) 471 (1.7%)
||
|David Smith
|-
| style="background:whitesmoke;"|London Centre   
Total votes: 34 765
| 
|David Peterson  9671 (27.8%)
|
|Mark Handelman  5348 (15.4%)
||
|Marion Boyd  17 837 (51.3%)
|
|John Van Geldersen  (FCP) 982 (2.8%)  Lloyd Walker  (F) 498 (1.4%)  Terry Smart  272 (0.8%)  Issam Mansour  (Comm) 84 (0.2%)  Sidney Tarleton  73 (0.2%)
||
|David Peterson
|-
| style="background:whitesmoke;"|London North   
Total votes: 43 770
| 
|Steve Buchanan  9990 (22.8%)
||
|Dianne Cunningham  18 079 (41.3%)
|
|Carolyn Davies  14 005 (32.0%)
|
|Bob Maniuk  (FCP) 1095 (2.5%)  Jack Plant  (F) 601 (1.4%)
||
|Dianne Cunningham
|-
| style="background:whitesmoke;"|London South   
Total votes: 41 115
| 
|Joan Smith  11 787 (28.7%)
|
|Bob Wood  9828 (23.9%)
||
|David Winninger  17 438 (42.4%)
|
|Paul Picard  (FCP) 1427 (3.5%)  Robert Metz  (FP) 635 (1.5%)
||
|Joan Smith
|-
| style="background:whitesmoke;"|Middlesex   
Total votes: 38 382
| 
|Doug Reycraft  12 002 (31.3%)
|
|Gordon Hardcastle  8957 (23.3%)
||
|Irene Mathyssen  12 522 (32.6%)
|
|Bill Giesen  (FCP) 4007 (10.4%)  Barry Malcolm  (F) 894 (2.3%)
||
|Doug Reycraft
|-
| style="background:whitesmoke;"|Sarnia   
Total votes: 29 586
| 
|Mike Bradley  8540 (28.9%)
|
|Mike Stark  6269 (21.2%)
||
|Bob Huget  10 860 (36.7%)
|
|Terry Burrell  (FCP) 2691 (9.1%)  Bill Ferguson  (CoR) 652 (2.2%)  Margaret Coe] (Lbt) 574 (1.9%)
||
|Andy Brandt
|-
| style="background:whitesmoke;"|Windsor—Riverside   
Total votes: 29 769
| 
|Doreen Oullette  6640 (22.3%)
|
|Vivian Tregunna  1096 (3.7%)
||
|Dave Cooke  21 144 (71.0%)
|
|Earl Amyotte  (FCP) 889 (3.0%)
||
|Dave Cooke
|-
| style="background:whitesmoke;"|Windsor—Sandwich   
Total votes: 29 298
| 
|Bill Wrye  11 807 (40.5%)
|
|Merv de Pendleton  1186 (4.0%)
||
|George Dadamo  15 952 (54.4)
|
|Joe Crouchman  353 (1.2%)
||
|Bill Wrye
|-
| style="background:whitesmoke;"|Windsor—Walkerville   
Total votes: 28 807
| 
|Mike Ray  11 581 (40.2%)
|
|François Michaud  1327 (4.7%)
||
|Wayne Lessard  15 899 (55.2%)
|
|
||
|Mike Ray
|}

Northeastern Ontario

|-
| style="background:whitesmoke;"|Algoma   
Total votes: 14 017
| 
|Bob Gallagher  3573 (25.5%)
|
|Denis Latulippe   433 (3.1%)
||
|Bud Wildman  8221 (58.7%)
|
|Stan Down  (CoR) 1790 (12.8%)
||
|Bud Wildman
|- 
| style="background:whitesmoke;"|Algoma—Manitoulin   
Total votes: 15 339
|| 
|Mike Brown  5961 (38.9%)
|
|Ken Ferguson   2163 (14.1%)
|
|Lois Miller  5754 (37.5%)
|
|Richard Hammond  (CoR) 1114 (7.3%)  Gene Solomon  347 (2.3%)
||
|Mike Brown
|-
| style="background:whitesmoke;"|Cochrane North   
Total votes: 16 354
| 
|Donald Grenier  6475 (39.6%)
|
|René Piché   3261 (20.0%)
||
|Len Wood  6618 (40.5%)
|
|
||
|René Fontaine
|-
| style="background:whitesmoke;"|Cochrane South   
Total votes: 24 069
| 
|Frank Krznaric  9361 (38.9%)
|
|Tina Positano   1019 (4.2%)
||
|Gilles Bisson  11 460 (47.6%)
|
|Ken Metsala  (CoR) 2229 (9.3%)
||
|Alan Pope
|-
| style="background:whitesmoke;"|Nickel Belt   
Total votes: 16 955
| 
|Betty Rheaume  3267 (19.3%)
|
|Paul Demers  967 (5.7%)
||
|Floyd Laughren  9925 (58.5%)
|
|Grenville Rogers  (CoR) 2796 (16.5%)
||
|Floyd Laughren
|-
| style="background:whitesmoke;"|Nipissing   
Total votes: 33 741
| 
|Stan Lawlor  10 745 (31.8%)
||
|Mike Harris   15 469 (45.8%)
|
|Dawson Pratt  7039 (20.9%)
|
|Edward Gauthier  (FCP) 488 (1.4%)
||
|Mike Harris
|-
| style="background:whitesmoke;"|Parry Sound   
Total votes: 23 020
| 
|Randy Sheppard  5125 (22.3%)
||
|Ernie Eves   10 078 (43.8%)
|
|Joe Boissonneault  2993 (13.0%)
|
|Richard Thomas  (G) 4061 (17.6%)  Julia Duggan  (FCP) 763 (3.3%)
||
|Ernie Eves
|-
| style="background:whitesmoke;"|Sault Ste. Marie   
Total votes: 38 713
| 
|Don MacGregor  13 339 (34.5%)
|
|John Solski   3347 (8.6%)
||
|Tony Martin  14 036 (36.3%)
|
|Don Edwards  (CoR) 7991 (20.6%)
||
|Karl Morin-Strom
|-
| style="background:whitesmoke;"|Sudbury   
Total votes: 32,530
| 
|Sterling Campbell  10,010 (30.8%)
|
|Mike Franceschini  3,318 (10.2%)
||
|Sharon Murdock  13,407 (41.2%)
|
|Billie Christiansen  (CoR) 5,795 (17.8%)
||
|Sterling Campbell
|-
| style="background:whitesmoke;"|Sudbury East   
Total votes: 30 232
| 
|Jean-Yves Robert  7484 (24.8%)
|
|John Johnson   1458 (4.8%)
||
|Shelley Martel  17 536 (58.0%)
|
|Greg Bigger  (CoR) 3754 (12.4%)
||
|Shelley Martel
|-
| style="background:whitesmoke;"|Timiskaming   
Total votes: 19,779
|| 
|David Ramsay  8,364 (42.3%)
|
|Garfield Pinkerton  2,261 (11.4%)
|
|Michelle Evans  6,191 (31.3%)
|
|James Fawcett  (CoR) 2,250 (11.4%)  Doug Fraser  (G) 713 (3.6%)
||
|David Ramsay 
|}

Northwestern Ontario

|-
| style="background:whitesmoke;"|Fort William   
Total votes: 26,551
|| 
|Lyn McLeod  11,798 (44.4%)
|
|Harold Wilson   4,300 (16.2%)
|
|Don Hutsul  10,453 (39.4%)
|
|
||
|Lyn McLeod
|- 
| style="background:whitesmoke;"|Kenora   
Total votes: 20 106
|| 
|Frank Miclash  8152 (40.5%)
|
|Dean McIntyre   1776 (8.8%)
|
|Doug Miranda  7821 (38.9%)
|
|Henry Wetelainen  2357 (11.7%)
||
|Frank Miclash
|- 
| style="background:whitesmoke;"|Lake Nipigon   
Total votes: 12,785
| 
|Judy Tinnes  3,083 (24.1%)
|
|Jim Vibert   735 (5.7%)
||
|Gilles Pouliot  8,335 (65.2%)
|
|Bill Thibeault  (FCP) 632 (5.0%)
||
|Gilles Pouliot
|- 
| style="background:whitesmoke;"|Port Arthur   
Total votes: 27 798
| 
|Taras Kozyra  10 885 (39.2%)
|
|Tony Stehmann  3854 (13.9%)
||
|Shelley Wark-Martyn  11 919 (42.9%)
|
|Claude Wyspianspki  (FCP) 1140 (4.1%)
||
|Taras Kozyra
|- 
| style="background:whitesmoke;"|Rainy River   
Total votes: 12 751
| 
|Dennis Brown  3878 (30.4%)
|
|Bob Davidson  1035 (8.1%)
||
|Howard Hampton  7838 (61.5%)
|
|
||
|Howard Hampton
|}

Post-election changes

Party affiliation switches
Tony Rizzo (NDP) became an independent MPP on October 10, 1990, after questions were raised about labour practices in his bricklaying firms.  He would later rejoin the NDP caucus.

Dennis Drainville (NDP) became an independent MPP on April 28, 1993, as a protest against the Rae government's plans to introduce casinos to the province. He later resigned his seat in the legislature, resulting in a by-election.

Will Ferguson (NDP) became an independent MPP on April 30, 1993, following accusations relating to the Grandview scandal. He later rejoined the NDP caucus on June 21, 1994, having been cleared of all charges.

John Sola (L) became an independent MPP on May 11, 1993, after making comments about Canadian Serbs that most regarded as racist.

Peter North (NDP) became an independent MPP on October 27, 1993, claiming he had lost confidence in the Rae government. He tried to join the Progressive Conservatives, but was rebuffed.

Byelections
Due to resignations, five by-elections were held between the 1990 and 1995 elections.

|-
| style="background:whitesmoke;"|Brant—HaldimandMarch 5, 1992
||
|Ronald Eddy9,565
|
|David Timms4,758
|
|Christopher Stanek2,895
|
|Donald Pennell (FCP)2,056Ella Haley (G)759Janice Wilson (Ind)250
||
|Robert Nixonresigned July 31, 1991
|-
| style="background:whitesmoke;"|Don MillsApril 1, 1993
|
|Murad Velshi5,583
||
|David Johnson9,143
|
|Chandran Mylvaganam1,513
|
|Diane Johnston (Ind Renewal)498Denise Mountenay (FCP)383Bernadette Michael (Ind)206David Pengelly (F)161Sat Khalsa (G)141
||
|Margery Warddied January 22, 1993
|-
| style="background:whitesmoke;"|St. George—St. DavidApril 1, 1993
||
|Tim Murphy8,750
|
|Nancy Jackman6,518
|
|George Lamony1,451
|
|Louis Di Rocco (FCP)347Phil Sarazen (G)209Judith Snow (Ind Renewal)119Ed Fortune (Ind)107Robert Smith (Ind)72John Steele (Comm League)57
||
|Ian Scottresigned September 8, 1992
|-
| style="background:whitesmoke;"|Essex SouthDecember 2, 1993
||
|Bruce Crozier12,736
|
|Joan Flood3,295
|
|David Maris1,100
|
|Joyce Ann Cherry (FCP)1,060Michael Green (G)132John Turmel (Ind)84
||
|Remo Manciniresigned May 10, 1993
|-
| style="background:whitesmoke;"|Victoria—HaliburtonMarch 17, 1994
|
|Sharon McCrae9,571
||
|Chris Hodgson11,941
|
|Art Field1,378
|
|Ron Hawkrigg (Lbt)252Bradley Bradamore (Ind)217John Turmel (Ind)123
||
|Dennis Drainvilleresigned September 27, 1993
|}

Vacancies
In addition, four seats were vacant in the final months of the legislature, as the sitting members resigned and by-elections were not held to replace them before the 1995 election:
Bruce — Murray Elston (L) resigned October 31, 1994
Kitchener — Will Ferguson (NDP) resigned October 8, 1994
Markham — Don Cousens (PC) resigned September 30, 1994
St. Andrew—St. Patrick — Zanana Akande (NDP) resigned August 31, 1994

See also
Politics of Ontario
List of Ontario political parties
Ontario Libertarian Party candidates, 1990 Ontario provincial election
Premier of Ontario
Leader of the Opposition (Ontario)

References

1990 elections in Canada
1990
1990 in Ontario
September 1990 events in Canada